Scopula separata is a moth of the  family Geometridae. It is found on Saint Helena. It is vulnerable according to the IUCN Redlist due to invasive plant species causing the food that are needed by the caterpillars to decrease. The invasion of non-native predators such as Hemidactylus frenatus and Scolopendra morsitans are also affecting the conservation of the insect. 51-60 percent of the population is currently protected.

References

Moths described in 1875
separata
Moths of Africa